The 1996–97 Missouri Tigers men's basketball team represented the University of Missouri during the 1996–97 men's college basketball season. The highlights of the season included upsetting rival and number-one ranked Kansas at home in double overtime and an unexpected run to the finals of the Big 12 tournament.

Schedule

 Note: Texas Tech later forfeited its win due to ineligible players.

References

Missouri Tigers men's basketball seasons
Missouri
Tiger
Tiger